Metarctia brunneipennis is a moth of the  subfamily Arctiinae. It was described by Hering in 1932. It is found in the Democratic Republic of Congo and South Africa.

References

 Natural History Museum Lepidoptera generic names catalog

Metarctia
Moths described in 1932